Curtitoma contraria is a species of sea snail, a marine gastropod mollusc in the family Mangeliidae.

It is the only known species with a sinistral shell within the family Mangeliidae.

Description
The length of the shell attains 3.6 mm, its diameter 1.9 mm.

Distribution
This marine species occurs off Taiwan.

References

 Bonfitto A. & Morassi M. (2012) A new sinistral turriform gastropod (Conoidea: Mangeliidae) from Taiwan. Zootaxa 3415: 63–68

External links
 MNHN, Paris: Curtitoma contraria

contraria
Gastropods described in 2012